Avengers: Infinity War (Original Motion Picture Soundtrack) is the film score for the Marvel Studios film Avengers: Infinity War by Alan Silvestri. Hollywood Records released the soundtrack album digitally on April 27, 2018, and in physical formats on May 18, 2018.

Background
In June 2016, Alan Silvestri, who composed the score for The Avengers, was revealed to be returning to score both Infinity War and its sequel. Although Silvestri reprised the main theme he introduced in the first Avengers film, he stated there were discussions to try and incorporate each character's individual established motif in his score, "but everyone was pretty much in agreement that it would be more of a distraction to even attempt it." Silvestri started to record his score in January 2018 and concluded in late March.

Silvestri felt working on the film "was a really different experience than anything I'd done before, especially in regard to the approach and balancing quick shifts in tone." He noted that "Thanos didn't just get his own musical theme, he got his own sensibility", while the Children of Thanos were linked musically to Thanos. Silvestri avoided giving each of the Infinity Stones a theme, as he had done in Captain America: The First Avenger with the Tesseract, saying, "The music for the Infinity Stones is actually built around Thanos' reaction. Every time he got one, that moment was always significant and often times emotional." Silvestri's score is entirely orchestral. Silvestri also used Ludwig Göransson's theme from Black Panther in the film, which was something Göransson had been hoping would happen given he was not involved in the Infinity War score.

The film also includes "The Rubberband Man" by The Spinners when the Guardians of the Galaxy first appear, which was chosen by Infinity War executive producer and director of the Guardians of the Galaxy films James Gunn. Gunn revealed that "Draw the Line" by Aerosmith, "Train in Vain" by The Clash, and "Caught in a Dream" by Alice Cooper were also considered for that moment. "New York Groove" by Ace Frehley was also used in another scene with the Guardians that was ultimately cut from the theatrical release. Hollywood Records and Marvel Music released the soundtrack album digitally on April 27, 2018, with a release in physical formats following on May 18. Two versions were released, a regular and deluxe edition, with the deluxe edition featuring some extended and additional tracks to the regular edition.

Track listing
All music composed by Alan Silvestri.

All music composed by Alan Silvestri.

Charts

Accolades

References

2018 soundtrack albums
2010s film soundtrack albums
Marvel Cinematic Universe: Phase Three soundtracks
Avengers (film series)
Alan Silvestri soundtracks